Robert Andersson may refer to:

Robert Andersson (water polo) (1886–1972), Swedish water polo player, diver, and freestyle swimmer
Robert Andersson (handballer) (born 1969), Swedish Olympic handball player
Robert Andersson (footballer) (born 1971), Swedish footballer

See also
Robert Anderson (disambiguation)
Robban Andersson (born 1974), Swedish TV personality
Robert Anderson (bowler)